The 2016–17 Moldovan Cup was the 26th season of the Moldovan annual football tournament. Zaria Bălți entered as the defending champions after winning the 2015–16 edition. The competition started on 20 August 2016 with the first preliminary round and concluded with the final at the Zimbru Stadium on 25 May 2017. Sheriff won a record 9th title following a 5–0 win over Zaria in the final. As winners, Sheriff would have been assured a place for the 2017–2018 UEFA Europa League first qualifying round; however, since they already qualified for the 2017–2018 UEFA Champions League second qualifying round by winning the title in the Divizia Națională, the Europa League entry went to Zaria Bălți, the highest team in the Divizia Națională table which had not already qualified for European competitions.

Format and Schedule
51 clubs entered this season's competition, an increase of four clubs compared with the 2015–16 total of 47 clubs. Both preliminary rounds and the first two rounds proper were regionalised to reduce teams travel costs. All ties level after 90 minutes used extra time to determine the winner, with a penalty shoot-out to follow if necessary.

Participating teams
The following teams are qualified for the competition. Reserve teams are excluded.

Number in brackets denote the level of respective league in Football in Moldova

First preliminary round
28 clubs from the Divizia B entered this round. Teams that finished higher on the league in the previous season played their ties away. All matches were played on 20 August 2016. Teams in bold continue to the next round of the competition.

|}

Second preliminary round
4 clubs from the Divizia B entered this round. Teams that finished higher on the league in the previous season played their ties away. Matches were played on 23 August 2016. Teams in bold continue to the next round of the competition.Rîșcani, Intersport Sănătăuca, Maiac Cioropcani, Grănicerul Glodeni, Cruiz Camenca, Sinteza Căușeni, Anina Anenii Noi, Sparta Chișinău, Sireți and Congaz received a bye for the second preliminary round.

|}

First round
The 12 winners from the preliminary rounds  joined the 12 Divizia A teams. In a match, the home advantage was granted to the team from the lower league. All matches were played on 3 September 2016. Teams in bold continue to the next round of the competition.

|}

Second round
The 11 winners from the previous round joined the 3 Divizia Națională sides seeded 9-11, Academia, Saxan and Ungheni.Gagauziya-Oguzsport received a bye for the second round. The home teams and the pairs for 3 Divizia Națională sides were determined in a draw held on 7 September 2016. Matches were played on 20 and 21 September 2016.  Teams in bold continue to the next round of the competition.

Final stage

Bracket

Round of 16
The 7 winners from the previous round and Gagauziya-Oguzsport joined the remaining 8 Divizia Națională sides seeded 1-8. The home teams and the pairs were determined in a draw held on 23 September 2016. Matches were played on 25 and 26 October 2016.  Teams in bold continue to the next round of the competition.

Quarter-finals
The 8 winners from the previous round entered the quarter-finals. The home teams were determined in a draw held on 28 October 2016. Matches were played on 26 April 2017. Teams in bold continue to the next round of the competition.

Semi-finals
The 4 winners from the previous round entered the semi-finals. The home teams were determined in a draw held on 28 April 2017. Matches were played on 16 May 2017. Teams in bold continue to the next round of the competition.

Final

The final was played on Thursday 25 May 2017 at the Zimbru Stadium in Chișinău. The "home" team (for administrative purposes) was determined by an additional draw held on 17 May 2017.

References

External links
Cupa Moldovei on soccerway

Moldovan Cup seasons
Cup
Moldova